This article lists the confirmed squads for the 2002 Women's Hockey World Cup tournament held in Perth, Australia, between November 24 and December 8, 2002.

Pool A

Argentina
Head Coach: Sergio Vigil

China
Head Coach: Kim Chang-back

Germany
Head Coach: Peter Lemmen

New Zealand
Head coach: Jan Borren

Russia
Head Coach: Oleg Potapov

Scotland
Head Coach: Mike Gilbert

Korea
Head Coach: Lim Heung-Sin

Ukraine
Head Coach: Tetyana Zhuk

Ukraine took only sixteen players to the World Cup

Pool B

Australia
Head Coach: David Bell

England
Head Coach: Tricia Heberle

Ireland
Head Coach: Riet Kuper

Japan
Head Coach: Akihiro Kuga

Netherlands
Head Coach: Marc Lammers

South Africa
Head Coach: Ros Howell

Spain
Head Coach: Jack Holtman

References

External links
WC 2002 on FIH-site
USA Field Hockey

squads
Women's Hockey World Cup squads